Tagani Inc., commonly known as Tagani, was a Philippine agricultural startup company founded by Kevin Cuevas in 2016. Its services included e-commerce for farm produce, e-learning for agribusiness, and digital farm management software services. The company was headquartered at the Asian Institute of Management in Makati City, Philippines.

The name Tagani is derived from the Tagalog word tag-ani ("harvest season"), composed of tag- ("time of" or "season of") and ani ("harvest"). It also means the Tagalog deity of good harvest, Tag-ani.

In 2019, Tagani was named by e27.co as one of the Top 100 startups in Asia Pacific representing the Philippines. As of August 2021, the company has permanently ceased operations following its Founding President & CEO's appointment at the National Economic and Development Authority.

History 
It started as the college project Amiga Philippines in 2016 which taught women farmers a simplified version of accounting translated in the Filipino language. In 2017, it won the Ten Accomplished Youth Organizations (TAYO) Awards under the Livelihood and Entrepreneurship category.

It later evolved into the corporation Tagani Inc., doing business as Tagani.ph, in August 2018 and represented the Philippines at the ASEAN Young Entrepreneurs Forum in Ho Chi Minh City, Vietnam. The company also participated in the Young Southeast Asian Leaders Initiative program of Brown University during the same year.

See also 
 Digital agriculture
 TAYO Awards

References

External links 
 Official website

Philippine companies established in 2016
Agriculture in the Philippines
Agricultural organizations based in the Philippines
Companies based in Makati
Asian Institute of Management